= Orestis Sousonis =

Greek footballer

Personal information
- Full name: Aristidis Orestis Sousonis
- Date of birth: 24 April 1999 (age 27)
- Place of birth: Athens, Greece
- Height: 1.73 m (5 ft 8 in)
- Position: Winger

Team information
- Current team: Lamia
- Number: 20

Youth career
- Panionios

Senior career*
Years	Team	Apps	(Gls)
2018–2019	Panionios	0	(0)
2020–	Lamia	0	(0)
- * Club domestic league appearances and goals as of 22:08, 9 March 2020 (UTC)

Orestis Sousonis (Greek: Ορέστης Σουσώνης; born 24 April 1999) is a Greek professional footballer who plays as a winger for Lamia.

== Club career ==
=== Panionios ===
Sousonis joined Panionios on 1 July 2018.

=== Lamia ===
On 11 February 2020, Sousonis joined Lamia on a three-year deal.
